Free is a French telecommunications company, subsidiary of Iliad that provides voice, video, data, and Internet telecommunications to consumers in France. Its head office is in the 8th arrondissement of Paris and it is the second-largest ISP in France.

Free provides ISP services in France and in the 30 OECD countries. It was the first company to offer a "triple play" service in France through its self-produced singular Freebox set-top box, claiming to have invented the box marketing concept in France in reference to all the other French ISPs who thereafter released "triple play" modems named to include the anglicism box as a suffix. These boxes provide comprehensive telecommunication services such as high-speed internet, telephone and digital television packages, leading Free to become the world's number one IPTV provider offering almost systematically IPTV to subscribers and optimizing it to be available on most landlines.

Developing its own 3G and 4G networks, Free Mobile was launched in 2012 and became the fourth mobile network operator in France.

History

1999–2001 

Free was the third ISP in France to offer Internet access without a subscription or a surcharged phone number, on 26 April 1999.

In 2002, Free was the first ISP to provide a V.92 connection.

2002-2003: ADSL at a disruptive price
Since September 2002, Free contributed significantly to French ADSL boom. The offer was able to launch as soon as the incumbent was forced to stop abuse of dominant position and to apply fair wholesale prices.

2004-2006: Unbundled ADSL and "triple play"

Unbundling, in France, refers to the obligation for the incumbent carrier France Telecom to lease the Local loop, because it is a natural monopoly. Although the unbundling process was intended to start by 2000, the actual unbundling process actually started at the end of 2002, after a long conflict between the French regulation authority ARCEP and the non-cooperative incumbent.

Free has to pay a rental fee of €9 per month and per subscriber to the incumbent for the Twisted pair of Copper between the area central office and the subscriber premises. Although more expensive than the real cost of €7.63, this solution is still far more profitable than the bundled option.

Since January 2003, a Freenaut has maintained an unofficial website, showing figures and graphics about Free unbundled network deployment (Free Unbundling). Another Freenaut website has provided network status monitoring maps Unbundling status and location since the end of 2003. These initiatives are made possible thanks to the transparency of Free's network: their equipment replies to ping and has a meaningful reverse DNS.

2007-present: Fiber to the home

On 11 November 2006, Free announced the deployment of a new fiber to the home (FTTH) network for its subscribers. The initial plan's goal is to cover Paris as well as some towns in the Paris suburbs and selected neighborhoods in other French cities by 2012. By December 2007, the work was 30% finished, and the remaining work was progressing "at a furious pace".

On 31 August 2007, Free updated the offer with more details. Download bandwidth shall be 100 Mbit/s and TV services shall be available for two televisions, at the same price of €29.99/month.

Free has developed its own fiber network technology, called Iliad P2P, based on Ethernet in the First Mile and having a point to point (P2P) topology. High curvature optic fibers are manufactured by the Dutch company Draka.

The deployment is still essentially in the horizontal phase (the vertical phase being connection to the subscriber premises), and large-scale deployment to customers is foreseen. On 26 June 2008,  and the mayor inaugurated Free's FTTH network in a district of Montpellier.

In March 2008, Iliad made the commitment to cover Paris at 75% by the second half of 2009, and reiterated its goal to connect 4 million French homes to its own FTTH network by 2012. Significant volumes of subscribers will be connected as soon as the legislative framework is in place, expected by ARCEP for autumn 2009.

Offers

Voiceband

Extent
The Voiceband Dial-up internet access offer counts for a very small number of subscribers currently, as 98% of French homes were eligible for ADSL in 2006.

Pricing
Free began its activities with the famous free-of-charge Internet access, although data phone calls fees are not included. Another offer combines an Internet access with 50 hours of data phone calls for 14.94 euros per month.

Freebox offer
Initially, Freebox was the name of the Freebox device, which consists of the Set-top box and Modem. Because of the device's popularity and reputation, it eventually became the name of the offer.

 Price: 29.99 euros;
 Best broadband connectivity available for the subscriber home: FTTH, unbundled or bundled;
 "Triple play" (broadband bundled connection) or "quadruple play" (broadband unbundled or FTTH connection) services;
 Free-of-charge migration to better connectivity when available to subscriber;
 Possibility to update the Freebox device; the upgrade price decreases with time and is free of charge after three years of subscription;
 A /60 IPv6 prefix.

Services

Internet access 

Early IPv6 deployment

According to a study published by Google at the RIPE meeting in October 2008, Free is probably the largest native IPv6 ISP in the World. By end 2008, almost all French IPv6 traffic measured in the study comes from Free customers.

Free deployed the IPv6 infrastructure in only 5 weeks, from 7 November to 11 December 2007, thanks to an innovative 6rd (IPv6 rapid deployment) proposal by Rémi Després.

 Wi-Fi community network

In May 2009 Free reconfigured the set-top boxes to act as Wi-Fi hotspots by default. With over 3 million hotspots, it is thought to be the largest Wi-Fi hotspot network in the world during that time. They require authentication which makes them only accessible to Free's ADSL and now mobile customers. Their main use is thus to let customers away from home continue accessing the Internet using the ADSL connection of other Free customer within Wi-Fi range. For security reasons this access is isolated from the ADSL user's normal Wi-Fi network, and is given lower priority.

Telephone
Included telephone calls

In 2003, Free introduced unlimited phone calls at no additional price, while other phone operators or ISPs charged per-minute fees for telephone calls. Competitors have then been forced to imitate these changes, but with fewer destinations included or at an additional price. Bundled Free subscribers enjoy same free calls as those unbundled since March 2004. Calls to United States and Canada have been free of charge since December 2005.

In 2006, Free and France Telecom were in conflict against an unfair increase of Neuf Cegetel own termination tariff, aimed at undermining unlimited phone offers in France. The French regulator ARCEP then decided to apply a threshold for call termination. Unlimited free phone calls have been perennial in France since then.

Telephone services
A wide range of telephone services are provided at no additional cost, such as an online answering machine, ringback tone customization, call transfer, caller ID, inbound and outbound call filtering, conference calls, and Wi-Fi voice SIP.

Since April 2007, each customer has been assigned a fax number in addition to the traditional phone number. This additional line is dedicated to the online faxing service.

Television

IPTV leader
According to a study published in 2008 by Light Reading, Free is by far the largest IPTV carrier in the World. This fact is also confirmed by the TV Markets Quarterly Monitoring.

ARDP protocol creator
Access rights of television channels are applied securely without requiring any smartcard, thanks to the ARDP protocol created by Free and submitted to the community through the IETF.

Freebox device
The sole property of Free, the Freebox device is loaned to the customer for the duration of the ADSL contract. More than a simple ADSL modem, it is the primary conduit through which Free provides many of its services. It also replaces many devices that customers may otherwise have to purchase and thus provides added value of its own. Customers wishing to use newer models — such as the Freebox Revolution — must pay an extra fee.

The latest revision is actually composed of two parts:
 A 'Server' device which houses an ADSL / optical fiber modem, 4 port gigabit switch, 802.11n/b/g Wifi access point/hotspot, powerline networking, router, 250GB NAS (extensible through USB and eSATA), wired and DECT wireless phone base, UPnP media server and more.
 A 'Player' set-top box which acts as an HD DVB recorder (using the Freebox Server NAS), TV over internet player, Blu-ray player, gaming console equipped with a gamepad and motion sensing remote, web browser.

Other services
 Unlimited Email addresses (1 GB each), web GUI based on Zimbra Collaboration Suite
 10 GB personal pages (PHP, MySQL/PostgreSQL, web tools such as WordPress)
 Large file exchange (up to 10 GB) with features such as online movie player, etc...

Corporate affairs

Market share 

Since August 2008, the parent company Iliad (including Free and Alice brands) is the second-largest ISP in France. The leader is Orange (former state monopoly company France Telecom), and the third is SFR.

In 2007 (a major consolidation year in the French broadband market), Free was the only ISP brand to gain market share.

Free was the second-largest French ISP until end June 2007, when competitor Neuf Cegetel acquired  (T-Online France). Neuf Cegetel used to grow essentially by purchasing its competitors, until it was itself absorbed by SFR.  Until 2009, Free has always had a higher organic growth than Neuf Cegetel and SFR.

Iliad regained its second place after buying "Alice Telecom" from Telecom Italia in the summer of 2008.

Until the purchase of Alice France, Free's subscribers growth was exclusively organic, except for the strategic acquisition of the  FTTH ISP in 2006 (about 500 subscribers).

 Free has the lowest churn rate amongst French broadband providers, below 1% per month.
 Iliad targets 4 million Broadband (ADSL and FTTH) subscribers by 2010 and an unbundling ratio of 85%.

Profitability

Free claims to be the first profitable ISP in France and to have the lowest subscriber acquisition cost amongst French operators.

The unbundling ratio is one of the key strategic figures:
 Free has QoS control on unbundled lines since these are connected to Free's own DSLAMs instead of France Telecom DSLAMs.
 Bundled lines generate expensive bandwidth fees paid to the incumbent France Telecom.
 TV multicast is not provided by France Telecom DSLAMs.

Because of bandwidth cost, only a subset of the TV services is offered to bundled subscribers; while unbundled subscribers can access value-added services such as VOD and Subscription VOD. These services' revenues are constantly increasing.

In 2007, Free had the greatest EBITDA margin of the sector in Europe, was the only actor to gain market share in France and had a debt ratio 10 times lower than the industry average. Thanks to these assets, the initial FTTH deployment (targeted at 2012) will be entirely self-financed by existing activities.

Although investors are concerned about the investments in both the 3G mobile network and an FTTH network (1 billion euros each), the perspectives of Free and of the whole sector in Europe are promising according to analysts.

Logos and slogans

Culture

Disruptive
Free is the last independent operator in France. Google, in the first years of its existence, was sometimes suggested as a comparison for the Free spirit. Unlike all other French broadband ISPs, nearly everything is designed within the company: Freebox devices, DSLAMs, network switches and the backend billing system. The company has a medium- and long-term industrial strategy rather than the short-term financial strategy of its competitors.

Free is often designated by journalists as the "broadband maverick", the "troublemaker of the Internet", a "do-it-yourselfer", a "pioneer in IPTV", a "truly disruptive company", the "geek's ISP", the "cactus of the telecoms", the "Broadband Rebel", "one of the greatest French industrial successes of the last twenty years", a "Silicon Valley success story", a "Robin Hood", an "Uncle Scrooge", a "nightmare vision for Orange, SFR and Bouygues".

Openness
The ISP, as well as its owner Xavier Niel, promote free and independent media, such as:
 Television channels that have emerged through Freebox thanks to fair and handy broadcast conditions: Nolife and Arrêt sur images.
 Toll-free legal music streaming: Deezer.
 TV 2.0: since June 2007, Freenauts can broadcast their own TV channel by plugging a simple analog camera into the Freebox.
 Video publishing platform vpod.tv.

Corporate culture

Corporate culture appears obvious from these remarkable facts:
 The call center is run almost entirely on Ubuntu-based PCs.
 On startup, each Freebox HD device was displaying Rock'n'roll on his LCD screen.
 On advertising pictures, the time displayed by the Freebox device is 13:37 (leet).
 In February 2000, Xavier Niel offered 10 million francs to Google directors to buy their search engine activities in France (the offer was declined).
 The name Free was chosen in 1999 two weeks before the launch of the service, and eventually became the company's name, the other candidate name being Online
 The Freebox device name was inspired by the name of a pack of cigarettes.

Popularity in France
Freenaut is the common designation for each internaut using the Internet through a Free connection. This community is estimated to reach between 10 and 12 million individuals as of March 2009. The Freenaut community includes a core group of technology enthusiasts who contribute to Free's influence and popularity in several ways:
 User web sites hosted by Free for free.
 Live  shows presenters.
  developers (news, weather, games, video blogs, alternate TV interfaces...).
 Free wiki writers.
 Developers of  software.
 Contributors to Free bugtracker.
 Network monitoring, unbundling curve graphs and FTTH deployment maps.

According to recurrent audience measurement reports conducted by Médiamétrie, Free's general portal is the fourth most popular website in France. During peak load hours, Free accounts for nearly half the traffic on the Amsterdam Internet Exchange.

Criticism
On 3 January 2013 at 4pm in France, Free released a new firmware for its latest modem named "Revolution" which contained an advertisement blocker. The firmware of the modems was updated when rebooting, and the Ad filtering was enabled by default. Within a few hours, Free gained media attention and was strongly criticized by website editors for penalizing them instead of Free's target Google. On 7 January at 8.30am, the Ad filtering was removed before Free ultimately decided, on 17 January at 6pm, to include the Ad filter and disable it by default. However, customers who restarted their modem between the 3 and 7 January had enabled the option without even knowing it.

Since Free is one of the biggest ISP in France, worries started to raise of French hosting forums concerning the people's interest into Ad blockers in general.

See also

General
 Free Mobile − Mobile broadband company
 Freebox − First "triple play" set-top box in the world

Services
  – large WiFi community 
  – personal television service (TV2.0) on TV

References

Further reading

External links
 Official website

Telecommunications companies established in 1999
French companies established in 1999
Companies based in Paris
Telecommunications companies of France
Internet service providers of France
French business families